Kazuhiro Kusayanagi    (born April 4, 1967) is a Japanese mixed martial artist. He competed in the Middleweight and Welterweight divisions.

Career
After a 6–9–1 career in Shooto and Lumax Cup, Kusayanagi volunteered for representing his promotion in Vale Tudo Japan in 1994. He was paired against David Levicki, a wing chun specialist that outweighed him by 90 lb. Kusayanagi charged at him with a takedown, but Levicki blocked it with help of his size and immediately started hitting the back of his head, which was legal under the rules. After dropping Kusayanagi to the ground, Levicki hit him with more punches until knocking him out. It would be Kusayanagi's only match at VTJ.

Personal life
In 2019, Kusayanagi was arrested under suspicion of paying for sex with a 14-year old child in September 2018.

Mixed martial arts record

|-
| Loss
| align=center| 9–17–3
| Yuki Sasaki
| TKO (punches)
| Shooto - Las Grandes Viajes 6
| 
| align=center| 1
| align=center| 0:46
| Tokyo, Japan
| 
|-
| Draw
| align=center| 9–16–3
| Larry Papadopoulos
| Draw
| Shooto - Las Grandes Viajes 3
| 
| align=center| 3
| align=center| 5:00
| Tokyo, Japan
| 
|-
| Loss
| align=center| 9–16–2
| Carlos Newton
| Submission (armbar)
| Shooto - Las Grandes Viajes 2
| 
| align=center| 1
| align=center| 2:17
| Tokyo, Japan
| 
|-
| Loss
| align=center| 9–15–2
| Todd Bjornethun
| TKO (punches)
| Shooto - Reconquista 4
| 
| align=center| 2
| align=center| 4:01
| Tokyo, Japan
| 
|-
| Loss
| align=center| 9–14–2
| Masanori Suda
| Decision (unanimous)
| Shooto - Reconquista 3
| 
| align=center| 3
| align=center| 5:00
| Tokyo, Japan
| 
|-
| Draw
| align=center| 9–13–2
| Masato Fujiwara
| Draw
| Shooto - Reconquista 2
| 
| align=center| 3
| align=center| 5:00
| Tokyo, Japan
| 
|-
| Win
| align=center| 9–13–1
| Akihiro Gono
| Submission (armbar)
| Shooto - Let's Get Lost
| 
| align=center| 4
| align=center| 2:52
| Tokyo, Japan
| 
|-
| Win
| align=center| 8–13–1
| Toru Koga
| Submission (armbar)
| Shooto - Vale Tudo Junction 2
| 
| align=center| 4
| align=center| 2:14
| Tokyo, Japan
| 
|-
| Loss
| align=center| 7–13–1
| Susumu Yamasaki
| Decision (split)
| Lumax Cup - Tournament of J '95
| 
| align=center| 2
| align=center| 3:00
| Japan
| 
|-
| Loss
| align=center| 7–12–1
| Kyuhei Ueno
| TKO (punches)
| Shooto - Complete Vale Tudo Access
| 
| align=center| 5
| align=center| 1:17
| Omiya, Saitama, Japan
| 
|-
| Win
| align=center| 7–11–1
| Yasushi Warita
| Submission (armbar)
| Shooto - Vale Tudo Access 4
| 
| align=center| 1
| align=center| 1:53
| Japan
| 
|-
| Loss
| align=center| 6–11–1
| Yuki Nakai
| Decision (unanimous)
| Shooto - Vale Tudo Access 2
| 
| align=center| 4
| align=center| 4:00
| Tokyo, Japan
| 
|-
| Loss
| align=center| 6–10–1
| David Levicki
| KO (punches)
| Vale Tudo Japan 1994
| 
| align=center| 1
| align=center| 1:20
| Urayasu, Chiba, Japan
| 
|-
| Loss
| align=center| 6–9–1
| Takeshi Tanaka
| Decision
| Lumax Cup - Tournament of J '94
| 
| align=center| 2
| align=center| 4:00
| Japan
| 
|-
| Win
| align=center| 6–8–1
| Yasunori Okuda
| Submission (armbar)
| Lumax Cup - Tournament of J '94
| 
| align=center| 1
| align=center| 1:01
| Japan
| 
|-
| Loss
| align=center| 5–8–1
| Erik Paulson
| Submission (triangle choke)
| Shooto - Shooto
| 
| align=center| 3
| align=center| 1:46
| Tokyo, Japan
| 
|-
| Loss
| align=center| 5–7–1
| Yasuto Sekishima
| Decision (unanimous)
| Shooto - Shooto
| 
| align=center| 5
| align=center| 3:00
| Tokyo, Japan
| 
|-
| Loss
| align=center| 5–6–1
| Manabu Yamada
| Submission (armbar)
| Shooto - Shooto
| 
| align=center| 1
| align=center| 1:05
| Tokyo, Japan
| 
|-
| Loss
| align=center| 5–5–1
| Naoki Sakurada
| Decision (unanimous)
| Shooto - Shooto
| 
| align=center| 5
| align=center| 3:00
| Tokyo, Japan
| 
|-
| Win
| align=center| 5–4–1
| Yutaka Fuji
| Submission (armbar)
| Shooto - Shooto
| 
| align=center| 1
| align=center| 0:00
| Tokyo, Japan
| 
|-
| Loss
| align=center| 4–4–1
| Naoki Sakurada
| Decision (majority)
| Shooto - Shooto
| 
| align=center| 5
| align=center| 3:00
| Tokyo, Japan
| 
|-
| Win
| align=center| 4–3–1
| Tomohiro Tanaka
| Submission (armbar)
| Shooto - Shooto
| 
| align=center| 1
| align=center| 0:00
| Osaka, Japan
| 
|-
| Draw
| align=center| 3–3–1
| Kenji Kawaguchi
| Draw
| Shooto - Shooto
| 
| align=center| 5
| align=center| 3:00
| Tokyo, Japan
| 
|-
| Loss
| align=center| 3–3
| Yuichi Watanabe
| Submission (kneebar)
| Shooto - Shooto
| 
| align=center| 1
| align=center| 0:00
| Tokyo, Japan
| 
|-
| Loss
| align=center| 3–2
| Tomonori Ohara
| KO (punch)
| Shooto - Shooto
| 
| align=center| 4
| align=center| 0:58
| Tokyo, Japan
| 
|-
| Win
| align=center| 3–1
| Satoshi Honma
| Submission (triangle choke)
| Shooto - Shooto
| 
| align=center| 1
| align=center| 1:17
| Tokyo, Japan
| 
|-
| Win
| align=center| 2–1
| Kaoru Todori
| Submission (armbar)
| Shooto - Shooto
| 
| align=center| 1
| align=center| 1:16
| Tokyo, Japan
| 
|-
| Loss
| align=center| 1–1
| Yoshimasa Ishikawa
| KO (spinning back kick)
| Shooto - Shooto
| 
| align=center| 4
| align=center| 0:13
| Tokyo, Japan
| 
|-
| Win
| align=center| 1–0
| Naoki Sakurada
| Submission (armbar)
| Shooto - Shooto
| 
| align=center| 1
| align=center| 0:00
| Tokyo, Japan
|

See also
List of male mixed martial artists

References

External links
 
 Kazuhiro Kusayanagi at mixedmartialarts.com
 Kazuhiro Kusayanagi at fightmatrix.com

1971 births
Japanese male mixed martial artists
Middleweight mixed martial artists
Welterweight mixed martial artists
Living people